Brandon Paak Anderson (born February 8, 1986), better known by his stage name Anderson .Paak, is an American rapper, singer, songwriter, record producer, and drummer. He released his debut mixtape, O.B.E. Vol. 1, in 2012 and went on to release Venice in 2014. In 2016 he followed up with Malibu, which received a nomination for Best Urban Contemporary Album at the Grammy Awards, followed by Oxnard, in 2018. At the 61st Grammy Awards, Paak won his first Grammy award for Best Rap Performance with the song "Bubblin". He won two more Grammy Awards in 2020 for Best R&B Album with Ventura and for Best R&B Performance for "Come Home" (featuring André 3000).

Apart from his solo career, Anderson formed the duo NxWorries in 2015 with record producer Knxwledge. He is frequently accompanied by the band Free Nationals, who play a variety of instruments, such as electric guitar, bass, piano, keyboards and drums, and also serve as backing vocalists. In 2021, he formed the duo Silk Sonic with fellow singer-songwriter Bruno Mars. The duo's debut single, "Leave the Door Open", became Anderson's first single to reach number one on the Billboard Hot 100, and was the recipient of four awards at the 64th Grammy Awards, including Song of the Year and Record of the Year.

Early life
Brandon Paak Anderson was born on February 8, 1986, at St. John's Regional Medical Center in Oxnard, California. He is of mixed African American and Korean heritage. Anderson's mother was born in South Korea during the Korean War to an African American man who is presumed to have been a soldier. She was abandoned in a Korean orphanage and adopted by an African-American family in Compton, California.
 	
At age seven, Anderson saw his estranged father attack his mother: "My little sister and I went out front and my pops was on top of my mom. There was blood in the street. He was arrested and that was the last time I saw him. I think he did 14 years."

Shortly after he started his senior year of high school, his mother was convicted of major fraud. "I got a call in class: 'They arrested your mom today.'" Anderson's mother pleaded guilty to defrauding investors of millions using her produce distribution company. She received a seven-year prison sentence.

Career

2009–2013: Career beginnings
Anderson began producing music from his bedroom as a teenager, while attending Foothill Technology High School. His first experiences performing were as a drummer at his family's church. In 2011, prior to being a successful working musician, Anderson became homeless with his wife and infant son after he was dismissed from his job at a marijuana farm in Santa Barbara. Early in his career, Anderson used the stage name Breezy Lovejoy.

In 2011, Anderson had started earning acceptance in the Los Angeles music world as he worked on his debut album. Shafiq Husayn of Sa-Ra and Los Angeles based rapper Dumbfoundead helped Anderson recover financially from losing his job in Santa Barbara by employing him as an assistant, videographer, editor, writer and producer. He completed O.B.E. Vol.1 and released the album on June 30, 2012. He became the drummer for former American Idol semi-finalist Haley Reinhart. After the release of O.B.E. Vol.1, Anderson changed his stage name to Anderson .Paak; he claims that the dot stands for "detail," the need to pay attention to detail.

On November 27, 2013, Paak produced and recorded Cover Art, an all-covers EP. Paak was inspired by the white artists of the 1950s who achieved commercial success by remaking songs written by Black blues and R&B singers, while hardly ever compensating the original artists. Cover Art reversed the process and transformed folk and rock classics from white musicians into a mold of soul, funk, jazz, left-field pop, hip-hop, and R&B. The album was released by the independent Hellfyre Club and OBE labels. Paak was the lead producer for Watsky's 2014 album All You Can Do and is featured on three of its sixteen tracks.

2014–2017: Venice and Malibu

On October 28, 2014, Paak released his debut album Venice as Anderson .Paak, on OBE and Steel Wool. Paak performed on six songs on Dr. Dre's 2015 album Compton and two on The Game's The Documentary 2.5. In 2014, Paak also joined Jhené Aiko on her 'Enter The Void' tour. In October 2015, he announced that he had recorded material with Schoolboy Q and 9th Wonder. Paak released his second album, Malibu, on January 15, 2016, to critical acclaim, featuring contributions from 9th Wonder, Rapsody, and Kaytranada.

In January 2016, he indicated that he had been recording with Flying Lotus. On January 30, 2016, Paak spoke with Scott Simon of NPR's Weekend Edition Saturday about his tumultuous background as a child of mixed-race parents, that the "." in his name stands for "detail", his apprenticeship with Dr. Dre and how all of these influences shaped his music. On January 30, Paak announced via Twitter he has signed to Dr. Dre's Aftermath Entertainment. He said he always sends his ideas to Dr. Dre and the two work very fast. In 2016, Paak was named one of the XXL Freshmen, along with Lil Dicky, Desiigner, Dave East, Denzel Curry, Lil Yachty, G Herbo, Lil Uzi Vert, 21 Savage, & Kodak Black.

In August 2016, Paak performed on NPR Music's Tiny Desk Concert series with his backing band the Free Nationals. The concert became one of "the most popular in the history of the series," according to NPR.

2018–2019: Oxnard and Ventura
In 2018, Paak's new single "Til It's Over" featured in a new TV commercial released by Apple Inc. The advertisement was directed by Spike Jonze, featuring FKA Twigs in the video, promoting the Apple HomePod smart speaker. Along with collaborations with Apple, "Til It's Over" was used in a playlist in the 2018 video game, Forza Horizon 4. His song Bubblin was in the playlist of Madden NFL 19. In an interview with Complex magazine posted on October 10, 2018, Paak revealed that his forthcoming album Oxnard would be released on November 16, 2018. Paak released his third studio album Oxnard on November 16. The album is executive produced by Dr. Dre and is an homage to Paak's hometown in California. The album has a heavy funk theme throughout the project and features artists such as Kendrick Lamar, Snoop Dogg, Pusha T, and J. Cole. The album features the song "Cheers", a Q-Tip featured track paying homage to his late friend Mac Miller. He also co-wrote 2 songs on the sixth album from Christina Aguilera, Liberation in 2018. On December 3, 2018, Paak announced a world tour in support of Oxnard. The tour is titled "Andy's Beach Club" and began in the U.S. on February 11, 2019, before heading over to Europe.

Paak released his fourth studio album, Ventura, on April 12, 2019, featuring artists such as André 3000, Smokey Robinson, Brandy, and the late Nate Dogg, among others. Ventura was executive produced by Dr. Dre and was released by Dre's record label, Aftermath Entertainment. The title follows the theme of his previous albums, making his way up the California coast. Whereas Oxnard covered various snippets of Paak's life in vivid detail, Ventura homes in on more personal details of the artist himself, returning to the mine of slick R&B and funk rap of his acclaimed debut Malibu. "Growing up in Oxnard gave me the grit and the church to find this voice of mine. One town over, I went further and found my depth," Paak said in a press statement. He also announced a new tour, titled "The Best Teef In the Game Tour" with Free Nationals, which began on May 17, 2019. The tour was supported by Thundercat, Mac DeMarco, Earl Sweatshirt, Noname, and Jessie Reyez. Paak's music video ''Bubblin'' was nominated for Best Director at the Berlin Music Video Awards in 2019.

2020–present: Silk Sonic
On January 20, 2020, Paak was a guest showcase model on the television game show The Price Is Right. Also in January 2020, Paak was featured on Eminem's eleventh studio album release titled Music to be Murdered By on the track "Lock It Up."

Paak released the non-album single "Lockdown" in June 2020, coinciding with the commemoration of Juneteenth in the United States. The music video, directed by Dave Meyers featured appearances from Jay Rock, Dumbfoundead, SiR, Syd (of The Internet) and other musicians. In August 2020, Paak was featured on the soundtrack to the Madden NFL 21 game, on the song "Cut Em In", featuring Rick Ross, which was also played during the end credits of Tom & Jerry.

On February 26, 2021, Paak and fellow American singer-songwriter Bruno Mars announced they formed a band together called Silk Sonic. Their debut studio album An Evening with Silk Sonic was released on November 12, 2021, and includes a collaboration with Thundercat and Bootsy Collins.

On April 21, 2021, Anderson .Paak signed a worldwide administrative deal with Warner Chappell Music in partnership with Dr. Dre's Hard Workin' Black Folks publishing company. The agreement includes Paak's and Bruno Mars' Silk Sonic single, "Leave the Door Open" and both Paak's music catalog and future releases. The mentioned single topped the US Billboard Hot 100, becoming .Paak's first song to do so. "Smokin Out the Window" also reached the top 10 on the Hot 100.  For the 2022 Grammy Awards, Silk Sonic received  four Grammy nominations for Leave the Door Open.

In November 2021, Paak partnered with Universal Music Group to form a new record label called Apeshit Inc.

In 2021, Paak worked with fellow American rapper Dr. Dre on an album for Rockstar Games video game Grand Theft Auto Online. The DLC was released on December 15, 2021, and the album  was released publicly on February 4, 2022, Paak was featured as a minor character in the game.

On February 13, 2022, Paak was a special guest (on drums) alongside fellow American rapper 50 Cent at the Super Bowl LVI Halftime Show, which featured performances from fellow American rappers Dr. Dre, Snoop Dogg, Eminem, Kendrick Lamar, and Mary J. Blige.

Personal life
Paak met his wife, Jaylyn, a music student from South Korea, while she was in college. In 2011, prior to being a successful working musician, Paak was working at a marijuana farm in Santa Barbara. He was dismissed without warning and became homeless with his wife and infant son. The couple had a second son in 2017.

Paak confirmed during an interview with The Breakfast Club that this is his second marriage, but that "Jaylyn is the one that matters."

Paak has a tattoo on his chest, depicting Stevie Wonder, Aretha Franklin, James Brown, Prince, and Miles Davis, and a tattoo on his arm with the text, "When I’m gone please don’t release any posthumous albums or songs with my name attached. Those were just demos and never intended to be heard by the public.”

Charity 
In 2016, Paak founded The Brandon Anderson Foundation, a nonprofit organisation which aims to "Support and create initiatives that uplift, engage and support the community through access to the arts, supplemental education and unique experiences to expand the imagination". In December 2017, he launched .Paak House, an annual benefit concert which helps raise funds for the organisation. Past performers at the concert include The Game, Jay Rock, Kali Uchis, Jhené Aiko, Ty Dolla $ign, Cordae, Freddie Gibbs, Masego, Thundercat and Schoolboy Q. As of 2021, the organisation has raised more than half a million dollars and provided over 3,000 families in the Greater Los Angeles area with basic necessities. In 2021 .Paak House was hosted at College Park in Oxnard, CA.

Discography

Studio albums
 Venice (2014)
 Malibu (2016)
 Oxnard (2018)
 Ventura (2019)

Collaborative albums
 Yes Lawd! (with Knxwledge, as NxWorries) (2016)
 An Evening with Silk Sonic (with Bruno Mars, as Silk Sonic) (2021)

Tours
Headlining
 Andy's Beach Club  (2019)
 The Best Teef In the Game Tour  (2020)
 An Evening With Silk Sonic at Park MGM  (2022)

Supporting
 Wintervention Tour  (2013)
 Enter The Void Tour  (2014)
 All You Can Do Tour  (2014)
 24K Magic World Tour  (2017)
 2022 Global Stadium Tour  (2022)

Awards and nominations

Notes

References
60. Jeremy Childs (December 19, 2021)https://amp.vcstar.com/amp/8899466002. Ventura county star. Retrieved April 27, 2022.

External links
 
 Anderson Paak on IMDb
Paak House website

1986 births
Living people
21st-century American rappers
20th-century African-American people
American male voice actors
African-American male rappers
African-American record producers
Aftermath Entertainment artists
American contemporary R&B singers
American musicians of Korean descent
American rappers of Asian descent
Grammy Award winners
Musicians from Oxnard, California
Alternative R&B musicians
Rappers from Los Angeles
Singers from Los Angeles
Record producers from California
Alternative hip hop musicians
Silk Sonic members
NxWorries members
Singer-songwriters from California
African-American male singer-songwriters
21st-century African-American male singers
American hip hop record producers
American pop singers
American funk singers
American funk drummers
21st-century American drummers
African-American drummers
Soul drummers
American male drummers